Wiseman Meyiwa (born 27 December 1999) is a South African retired footballer. During his playing career, he represented South African Premier Division club Kaizer Chiefs and the South African national team. He was forced to retire at the age of 19 after being rendered a paraplegic following a motor vehicle accident in 2018.

Club career

Kaizer Chiefs
Meyiwa is a product of the Kaizer Chiefs academy, having joined the club in 2014. During the 2017–18 campaign, he was promoted to the first team by manager Steve Komphela and scored on debut against Cape Town City in September 2017, aged 17. Upon doing so, he broke a long-standing record held by Marks Maponyane to become the youngest player to both represent and score for the club in a professional match. Following his debut, speculation arose that Meyiwa had lied about his age but this was denied by club chairman Kaizer Motaung and nothing further came from the allegations.

In November 2018, he was involved in a motor vehicle accident on the N3 Highway in the Free State Province of South Africa and had to be transported to the intensive care unit via ambulance. On 31 January 2019, Kaizer Chiefs released a statement that Meyiwa had been forced to retire as a result of the injuries he sustained in the accident; injuries which included an unstable fracture of his thoracic vertebrae and which resulted in permanent paraplegia. He made 21 appearances for the club in total across all competitions.

International career

South Africa
Meyiwa is a former South African youth international and represented his nation at the 2015 FIFA U-17 World Cup and the 2017 FIFA U-20 World Cup. He made a single appearance for the South African national team on 12 August 2017 in a 2018 African Nations Championship qualification match against Zambia.

Career statistics

International

References

Living people
1999 births
South African soccer players
South Africa international soccer players
Kaizer Chiefs F.C. players
Association football midfielders
South African Premier Division players
South Africa youth international soccer players
South Africa under-20 international soccer players